Henrik Norby (18 March 1889 – 28 October 1964) was a Norwegian modern pentathlete. He competed at the 1912 Summer Olympics.

References

1889 births
1964 deaths
Norwegian male modern pentathletes
Olympic modern pentathletes of Norway
Modern pentathletes at the 1912 Summer Olympics
Sportspeople from Oslo